The Indian Library Association (ILA) was established on September 13, 1933 Registered under the societies Registration Act (XXI of 1860), on the occasion of the First All India Library Conference held at Calcutta (now Kolkata). The ILA is the largest and renowned professional body in the field of Library and Information Science in India with a membership of more than 7000. The headquarters of ILA situated in Delhi, India.

Objectives
The main objectives of the association are:
Promoting library movement in the country
Developing Library and Information Science education
Training and research, betterment of library personnel
Cooperation at the national and international levels
Promotion of standards, norms, services and guidelines
Providing a forum for professionals and publication of materials
Establishment of libraries, documentation centres and assistance to their establishment and working
Promotion of appropriate library legislation in India

Conferences
Its 53rd Annual conference was held in Hyderabad in 2007.
Its 54th Annual conference was held in Mumbai in 2008.
Its 55th Annual conference was held at Birla Institute of Management Technology, Greater Noida from 21–24 January 2010 India.
63rd Annual Conference was held at Babasaheb Bhimrao Ambedkar University, Lucknow from 23–25 November 2017 on the topic "Sustainable Development of Library and Information Science Profession".This was an international conference organised by Department of LIS and Gautam Buddha Central Library of Babasaheb  Bhimrao Ambedkar University Lucknow.

Founding members
 C. Woolner
 Mohammad Shafi
 Abdul Majid
 Mohammed Kasem Ali
 Abnashi Ram Talwar
 P. C. Neogi
 A.M.R. Montague
 R. Gopalan
 S. Ramasubbier
 Ram Labhaya
 Trivikrama Rao
 S. Bashiruddin
 Dr. M. O. Thomas
 S. Mahendra Singh
 Dr. Wali Mohammaed
 S. R. Ranganathan
 K. M. Asadullah
 Sant Ram Bhatia
 K. Sellaiah
 Sarada Prasad Sinha
 Kshitendra Dev Rai Mahasaya
 T. C. Dutta
 Kumar Munindra Dev
 R. Mahasaya
 Upendra Chandra Das
 Labhu Ram
 Ayyanki Venkata Ramanayya
 Manchanda
 Yousufuddin Ahmad

The Journal of Indian Library Association is an official organ of Indian Library Association). This journal covers all different aspects of library and information science, and has been the official organ of the association since 1965. The journal is issued as a quarterly publication and is peer-reviewed.

References
Ravindra N Sharma. "The Indian Library Association" in Encyclopedia of Library and Information Science. Marcel Dekker Inc. New York. Basel. 1985. Volume 38. Supplement 3. Page 230 et seq.
Jagdish Chandra Mehta. 50 Years of Indian Library Association, 1933-1983: Golden Jubilee. 1983.
http://www.ilaindia.net/

http://www.ilaindia.net/jila/index.php/jila

Libraries in India